Brandon Durell Allen (born February 12, 1986) is an American professional baseball coach and former first baseman who is the assistant hitting coach for the St. Louis Cardinals of Major League Baseball (MLB). He played in MLB for the Arizona Diamondbacks, Oakland Athletics and Tampa Bay Rays and in Nippon Professional Baseball (NPB) for the Fukuoka SoftBank Hawks.

Professional career

Chicago White Sox
Allen was drafted by the Chicago White Sox in the fifth round of the 2004 Major League Baseball Draft.

Arizona Diamondbacks
On July 7, he was traded from the White Sox to the Arizona Diamondbacks for pitcher Tony Peña.

Allen was called up to the majors for the first time on August 22, 2009 and made his debut that day. He finished the game one for four with a single. Allen would play in 32 games that season and finished with a .202 batting average, four home runs, and 14 RBIs.

After spending most of the 2010 season at Triple-A Reno, Allen was called up on September 1, 2010. In his first game against the San Diego Padres, he hit his first career grand slam. He finished the season with a .267 batting average in 22 games.

Oakland Athletics
On July 31, 2011, Allen was traded to the Oakland Athletics with Jordan Norberto for Brad Ziegler. He was optioned to Triple-A Sacramento.

On August 23, 2011, Allen became only the second player in history to hit a home run into the upper deck at the New Yankee Stadium (Russell Branyan being the first). Later in the game he hit a shorter home run into the second deck to help the Athletics defeat the Yankees 6–5.

On April 9, 2012, Allen was designated for assignment.

Tampa Bay Rays
On April 19, 2012, Allen was claimed off waivers from the Oakland Athletics by the Tampa Bay Rays.

Allen had his first career hit as a member of the Tampa Bay Rays, a two-run walk-off home run against the Los Angeles Angels of Anaheim which resulted in the Rays sweeping the series. He was again designated for assignment and was subsequently released.

Texas Rangers
In 2013, Allen signed a minor league deal with an invitation to spring training by the Rangers. By the end of spring training, Allen was released by the Rangers.

San Diego Padres
On April 9, 2013, Allen signed a minor league deal with the Padres. He played 2013 with Triple-A Tucson, where he was used mostly at first base, but also played in 40 games in left field. In 119 games with the Padres, he hit .267 with 17 HR, 76 RBI and 24 doubles.

New York Mets
On November 19, 2013, Allen signed a minor league deal with the New York Mets. He spent 2014 and 2015 with their AAA affiliate, the Las Vegas 51s.

Cincinnati Reds
On November 30, Allen signed a minor league deal with the Cincinnati Reds. on April 8, 2016 Allen had his contract purchased by the Reds. He was designated for assignment two days later without appearing in a game. He became a free agent on October 11, 2016.

Coaching career 
On June 22, 2017, Allen became the hitting coach for the Johnson City Cardinals, the Rookie-league affiliate of the St. Louis Cardinals. In 2018, he was promoted to be the hitting coach of the Single-A Palm Beach Cardinals. He was named hitting coach for the Double-A Springfield Cardinals in 2019, and was again promoted to become the hitting coach of the Triple-A Memphis Redbirds in 2020.

On November 6, 2022, Allen became the assistant hitting coach for the Cardinals, earning his first major league coaching position.

References

External links

1986 births
Living people
African-American baseball coaches
African-American baseball players
American expatriate baseball players in Japan
People from Conroe, Texas
Baseball coaches from Texas
Baseball players from Texas
Major League Baseball first basemen
Nippon Professional Baseball first basemen
Arizona Diamondbacks players
Oakland Athletics players
Tampa Bay Rays players
Fukuoka SoftBank Hawks players
Bristol White Sox players
Great Falls White Sox players
Kannapolis Intimidators players
Winston-Salem Warthogs players
Birmingham Barons players
Charlotte Knights players
Reno Aces players
Sacramento River Cats players
Durham Bulls players
Charlotte Stone Crabs players
Tucson Padres players
St. Lucie Mets players
Las Vegas 51s players
Louisville Bats players
Scottsdale Scorpions players
Estrellas Orientales players
American expatriate baseball players in the Dominican Republic
Caribes de Anzoátegui players
Minor league baseball coaches
21st-century African-American sportspeople
20th-century African-American sportspeople